Events from the year 1775 in Austria

Incumbents
 Monarch – Maria Theresa
 Monarch – Joseph II

Events

 
 

 January – The Habsburg monarchy forces the Ottoman Empire to cede Bukovina.

Births

 

  
 March 30 – Hieronymus Karl Graf von Colloredo-Mansfeld, Austrian corps commander during the Napoleonic Wars (d. 1822)
 April 5 – Johann Nepomuk Rust, Austrian surgeon (d. 1840)
Adam Albert von Neipperg, Austrian general and statesman (d. 1829)
 June 12 - Johann Baptist Malfatti von Monteregio, Italian-Austrian physician (d. 1859)

Deaths

References

 
Years of the 18th century in Austria